DipTrace is a software suite for electronic design automation (EDA) to create schematic diagrams and printed circuit board layouts.  DipTrace has four modules: schematic capture editor, PCB layout editor with built-in shape-based autorouter and 3D preview, component editor, and pattern editor.

Features

 Simple user interface
 Multi-sheet and hierarchical schematics
 High-speed and differential signal routing
 Smart manual routing modes
 Wide import/export capabilities
 High-speed shape-based autorouter
 Advanced verifications with real-time DRC
 Real-time 3D PCB preview
 Export of PCB to STEP 3D file format
 ODB++ and Gerber (including Gerber X2) manufacturing outputs

3D preview

This module includes real-time 3D preview & export feature. It shows the model of the manufactured printed circuit board with all components installed. Rotate board in three axes, zoom in and out in real time, change colors of the board, copper areas, solder mask, silkscreen, and background. 3D preview works on all stages of the design.

Export
Board can be exported to STEP or VRML 2.0 formats for mechanical CAD modeling. More than 7500 3D models of PCB packages are supplied for free. Externally designed 3D models in *.wrl, *.step, *.iges, and *.3ds formats can be uploaded and attached to patterns in Pattern Editor or PCB Layout.

Modules
DipTrace has a launcher application with five buttons that help users easily start each DipTrace module:
 Schematic Capture
 PCB Layout
 Component Editor
 Pattern Editor
 Get Started with Video Guide (link to video and PDF tutorial webpage)

Schematic capture

Advanced circuit design tool with support of multi-sheet and multi-level hierarchical schematics that delivers a number of features for visual and logical pin connections. Cross-module management ensures that principal circuits can be easily converted into a PCB, back-annotated, or imported/exported from/to other EDA software, CAD formats and net-lists. DipTrace Schematic has ERC verification and Spice export for external simulation.

PCB layout
Engineering tool for board design with smart manual routing, differential pairs, length-matching tools, shape-based autorouter, advanced verification, layer stackup manager, and wide import/export capabilities. Design requirements are defined by net classes, class-to-class rules, and detailed settings by object types for each class or layer. When routing with real-time DRC, the program reports errors on the fly before actually making them. DRC also checks length and phase tolerances for differential pairs and controls signal synchronization for nets and buses (including layer stackup and bonding wire induced signal delays). The board can be previewed in 3D and exported to STEP format for mechanical CAD modeling. Design rule check with in-depth detailing and net connectivity verification procedures are available.

Component editor
Manage component libraries and create single- or multi-part components by selecting a template and its dimensions, defining visual and electrical pin parameters, setting up a Spice model, and attaching pattern with a 3D model to finalize component creation. BSDL import, bulk pin naming, and pin manager tools for pins and buses. Importing libraries from different EDA formats. More than 140000 components in standard libraries.

Pattern editor
Draw patterns with various types of shapes, pads, holes, and dimensions. Circle, lines (headers, DIP), square (QFP), matrix (BGA), rectangle (RQFP), and zig-zag standard templates. Creation of pattern is basically selecting a template, entering a couple of vital parameters, drawing the silkscreen, and launching automatic pad renumbering. Custom templates can be created for non-standard patterns. DXF import makes creating complex layouts easier.

Pricing

 Note: Non-profit hobbyists can request a free "Lite" upgrade. †
 Note: Unlimited plane layers (power, ground) for all editions, which means 2 signal layers editions can create 4-layer boards. ‡

Free versions
A version of DipTrace is freely available with all the functionality of the full package except that it is limited to 300 pins and non-commercial use or 500 pins (non-commercial use, contact for free upgrade) and two signal layers. Power and ground plane layers do not count as signal layers, so the free versions can create four-layer boards with full power and ground planes. No board size restrictions.

Version history

Version 4.3
 Released July 27, 2022
 Built-in Spice simulator.
 XML for PCB, Schematic, Component Editor and Pattern Editor.
 SMD / THT pads in PCB Layout design information. 
 Custom column title for BOM, Pick and Place.

Version 4.2

 Released November 2, 2021
 New XML format for component and pattern libraries
 Environment Variables in all paths
 Edge rails for a single board option.
 Radial / Polar placement of design objects in PCB Layout and Pattern Editor
 Side and isometric view buttons in 3D preview dialogs

Version 4.1

 Released February 3, 2021
 Improved panelizing
 Improved BOM
 Improved pick and place
 Import/Export improvements
 Raster pictures in PCB

Version 4.0

 Released May 20, 2020
 Arc trace routing
 Teardrop connections to pads and T-junctions
 `IPC-7351 libraries & patterns
 Round rectangle & D-shape pads
 Courtyard layer
 Component outline layer
 Similar pad numbers are allowed
 Three methods to create 3D models
 Obround shapes instead of ellipses
 Etch text or picture/logo in copper pour

Version 3.3

 Released October 22, 2018

Version 3.2

 Released October 26, 2017
 Length matching rules.
 Real-time length comparison table.
 Layer stackup table.
 Using layer stackup and pad signal delay for trace length and differential pair phase calculation.
 Meander tool for any trace, easy resizing and moving of meanders.
 DRC same net clearance check (Trace to Trace, SMD to Pad, SMD to Via, SMD to SMD).
 Altium ASCII import (Schematic, PCB, libraries).
 Eagle XML import (Schematic, PCB, libraries).

Version 3.1

 Released May 29, 2017

Version 3.0

 Released March 10, 2016
 Differential pairs: define differential pair and its rules; automatic or manual defining of paired pads; paired routing and editing of differential pair; single-track differential pair routing and editing; phase tune tool (place custom / regular size meanders); real-time control of phase and length tolerance; differential pair manager; support of differential pairs for external autorouters, recognition of paired traces.
 Custom user-defined keyboard shortcuts for tools and dialogs.
 ODB++ (version 7.0) manufacturing output.
 Gerber X2 manufacturing output.
 DRC rule details (easy editing of routing constraints).
 Tree view of 3D models in All Models list, sorted by categories (folders).
 Overall speed and memory optimization for large designs.
 Optimized UI fonts.
 8143 new components.
 5694 new STEP models for 3D.

Community
Some hobby and educational groups such as the PICAXE forum members have developed libraries specific to the PICAXE range of microcontroller as produced by Revolution Education including many of the frequently used associated integrated circuits. PICAXE related libraries can be found in the net.

In January 2011, Parallax switched from EAGLE to DipTrace for developing its printed circuit boards.

See also

 Comparison of EDA software
 List of free electronics circuit simulators

References

External links
  multilanguage (English, French, Italian, Turkish, Ukrainian, Russian)
 DipTrace at Seattle Robotics Society meeting
 DipTrace at Nuts and Volts - October 2006
 DipTrace review at CNet

Electronic design automation software
Electronic design automation companies